Morten Nordeide Johansen (born 26 September 1951) is a Norwegian luger, born in Oslo. He competed at the 1976 Winter Olympics in Innsbruck, where he placed 20th in singles.

References

External links

1951 births
Living people
Sportspeople from Oslo
Norwegian male lugers
Olympic lugers of Norway
Lugers at the 1976 Winter Olympics